Daegu Metro Line 3 is the third line in the Daegu Metro rapid transit system in Daegu, South Korea. It is operated by the Daegu Transit Corporation. Daegu Metro Line 3 is a monorail line, and Hitachi Monorail was contracted for the supply of monorail, track switches and signalling system. It is Korea's first straddle-type monorail system.

Rolling Stock

Line 3's rolling stock are referred to as 3000-series. There  are 28 3-car sets or 84 cars in total. It is based on the standard Hitachi Monorail system. Hitachi Rail built the prototype car set with remaining 27 sets built by Woojin Industrial Systems.

Stations

See also 
 Daegu Metro Line 1
 Daegu Metro Line 2

References

External links
 Daegu Metropolitan Transit Corporation
 railway-technology.com

Monorails
Railway lines opened in 2015
 
Daegu subway lines
Monorails in South Korea
2015 establishments in South Korea